In literature, the deuteragonist or secondary main character is the second most important  character of a narrative, after the protagonist and before the tritagonist. The deuteragonist often acts as a constant companion to the protagonist or someone who continues actively aiding a protagonist. The deuteragonist may switch between supporting and opposing the protagonist, depending on their own conflict or plot.

History
Greek drama began with simply one actor, the protagonist, and a chorus of dancers. The playwright Aeschylus introduced the deuteragonist; Aristotle says in his Poetics:

Aeschylus' efforts brought the dialogue and interaction between characters to the forefront and set the stage for other playwrights of the era, like Sophocles and Euripides, to produce many iconic plays.

Drama
Because Ancient Greek drama involved only three actors (the protagonist, deuteragonist, and tritagonist) plus the chorus, each actor often played several parts. For instance, in Sophocles' Oedipus Rex, the protagonist would be Oedipus, who is on stage in most acts, the deuteragonist would be Jocasta (Oedipus' mother and wife), and the tritagonist would play the Shepherd and Messenger. 

This would be because Jocasta is certainly a major role—acting opposite Oedipus many times and occupying a central part of the story—and because the Shepherd and Messenger are onstage when Jocasta is offstage.

References

Further reading

External links 
 

Ancient Greek theatre
Drama
Protagonists by role